Classic is the ninth studio album by Canadian country music artist Terri Clark. It was released on November 13, 2012 via BareTrack Records/EMI Canada. The album features duets with Reba McEntire, Jann Arden, Dierks Bentley, Tanya Tucker and Dean Brody.

Background
Classic consists of cover versions of songs that have played an important part in Terri's life.
"This is the type of 'timeless' project I've wanted to do my whole life. It signifies so many things for me- my family roots, the Opry, my history and influences as an artist, and the songs that make up so much of the fabric of country music"

-Terri Clark

Critical reception
The album received positive reviews from music critics. Matt Bjorke of Roughstock gave the album four stars out of five, praising Clark's vocal performances.

Singles
The lead single from Classic, "Love Is a Rose", was released on October 23, 2012. "I'm Movin' On" was released on February 5, 2013 as the second single off the album. The music video premiered on February 16 on the Chevrolet Top 20 Countdown on CMT Canada. The video premiered on VEVO on March 18, 2013.

Track listing

Personnel

 Jann Arden – duet vocals on "Leavin' on Your Mind"
 Jason Barry – acoustic guitar
 Dierks Bentley – duet vocals on "Golden Ring"
 Dean Brody – duet vocals on "I'm Movin' On"
 Jason Cheek – drums, percussion
 Terri Clark – acoustic guitar, lead vocals, background vocals
 Chris Cottros – electric guitar
 Chad Cromwell – drums, percussion
 Stuart Duncan – fiddle
 Paul Franklin – steel guitar
 Kenny Greenberg – electric guitar
 Tania Hancheroff – background vocals
 Tony Harrell – accordion
 Ty Herndon – background vocals
 Wes Hightower – background vocals
 John Hobbs – keyboards, piano
 B. James Lowry – acoustic guitar
 Reba McEntire – duet vocals on "How Blue"
 Mark McIntyre – bass guitar
 Brent Mason – electric guitar
 Lyle Molzan – drums, percussion
 Michael Rhodes – bass guitar
 Ilya Toshinsky – banjo, acoustic guitar
 Tanya Tucker – duet vocals on "Delta Dawn"
 Glenn Worf – bass guitar

Chart performance
Singles

References

2012 albums
Terri Clark albums
EMI Records albums
Covers albums